Irruputuncu is a volcano in the commune of Pica, Tamarugal Province, Tarapacá Region, Chile, as well as San Pedro de Quemes Municipality, Nor Lípez Province, Potosí Department, Bolivia. The volcano also features lava flows, block and ash flows and several lava domes. The volcano is part of the Andean Central Volcanic Zone (CVZ).

The volcano has been active during the Pleistocene and Holocene, with major eruptions occurring 258.2 ± 48.8 ka ago, between 55.9 ka and 140 ka ago and 1570 ± 900 BP (380 ± 900 AD), which were accompanied by the formation of ignimbrites. Historical volcanic activity is less clear; an eruption in 1989 is considered unconfirmed. Plumes linked to phreatomagmatic eruptive activity were observed on 26 November 1995 and 1 September 2003. Seismic activity is also observed on Irruputuncu, and ongoing fumarolic activity releasing  of  has left sulfur deposits in the active crater.

The Central Volcanic Zone is thinly inhabited and most volcanoes are not under reconnaissance, but Irruputuncu is watched by the Chilean SERNAGEOMIN geologic service. The possibility of geothermal energy production from the volcano has been examined.

Etymology and alternative names 
The name Irruputuncu derives from Aymara iru spiny Peruvian feather grass and phutunqu a small vessel or a hole, pit, crater. Alternative names are Irruputunco and Iruputuncu.

Geography and geology

Regional setting 
The subduction of the Nazca plate and the Antarctic plate beneath the western side of South America has generated a belt of volcanic activity named the Andean Volcanic Belt. The belt is separated in a number of volcanic zones by segments lacking recent volcanic activity; in these segments, shallow subduction of the plates presumably displaces the asthenosphere away from these segments. The segments with active volcanism are the Northern Volcanic Zone (NVZ), the Central Volcanic Zone (CVZ), the Southern Volcanic Zone (SVZ) and the Austral Volcanic Zone  (AVZ).  The "Volcanoes of the World" catalogue counts about 575 eruptions in the entire volcanic belt.

Volcanic activity in the belt is usually linked to the dehydration of the subducting slabs, which causes water and other subducted components to be added to the overlying mantle. In the case of the CVZ, this addition generates magmas that are further modified by the thick crust in the area, forming andesites, dacites and rhyolites.

Local setting 
Volcanism in the CVZ is linked to the subduction of the Nazca plate beneath the South America plate. This subduction within the past  27.5 mya has triggered a thickening of the crust and orogeny. Approximately 44 volcanic centres that are either active or potentially active are found in the CVZ. Some centres are fumarolically active; these include Alitar, Lastarria and Tacora. Irruputuncu and other volcanoes including Guallatiri, Isluga, Lascar and San Pedro have displayed phreatic or magmatic-phreatic activity. The arid climate of the area has led to good preservation of volcanic structures.

Irruputuncu is part of an elliptical alignment of volcanoes that extends to the east, which may be linked to a cup-shaped intrusion in the crust. Older Pliocene volcanoes around Irruputuncu are Laguna volcano to the northeast and Bofedal to the southeast. Irruputuncu lies at the end of a chain of volcanoes that trends northeastward away from it. It may be part of a larger volcano system in the area.

The volcanic complex sits on top of ignimbrite layers, the Miocene Ujina and Pleistocene Pastillos Ignimbrites. In terms of composition, the Ujina is pink-grey crystals and pumice and the Pastillos a gray-white pumice forming the lower member and the upper member of the Pastillos contains cinerites with accessory claystones, siltstones and diatomites. Further volcanic rocks beneath Irruputuncu are hydrothermally altered dacites that may be part of an older now deeply eroded edifice.

They have weakly developed ogives and there is no evidence of glacial activity anywhere on the volcano. The current edifice is constructed within a collapsed amphitheater of an older edifice. Overall, the volcano has a pristine morphology. Block and ash flows and thick lava flows of high viscosity form the stratocone. A rhyolitic ignimbrite is found southwest of the volcano.

The younger flows are known as Queñoas lava flows; they form six distinct flows on the western sides of the volcano. These thicknesses may be the result of high-viscosity magma and/or low eruption rates. It contains large blocks and has long flow ridges. Its blocks are somewhat smaller and its ridges are poorly developed. Fissure eruptions have generated large lava flows from the flanks.

Irruputuncu underwent a flank collapse that subdivides the volcano into two edifices, the older Irruputuncu I and the younger Irruputuncu II, about 140 ± 40 ka ago. Each stage is associated with an individual crater named Crater I and Crater II. The flank collapse was probably produced by oversteepening of the volcano or by asymmetric growth. Subsequent activity of the volcano has completely filled the scarp.

Irruputuncu displays vigorous fumarolic activity that occupies about half the summit crater and is visible within several . In addition, argon, carbon monoxide, helium, hydrogen and sulfur are found. The temperatures of the fumaroles are comparable with or exceed the boiling point at such altitudes. ASTER imagery indicates Irruputuncu's fumarole field has a small surface area with high temperatures. The fumarolic activity has left sulfur deposits on the volcano. Deposits are generally yellow but close to the fumaroles they display different colours depending on their temperatures. Upon exposure to the air they can burn. Gravel and eolian deposits form sedimentary units around the volcano.

Composition 
Irruputuncu's rocks consist of andesite- and dacite-containing hornblende and pyroxene. The El Pozo ignimbrite is pumice-rich and has a composition between trachyandesite and trachydacite. Minerals amphibole, biotite, hornblende, quartz and plagioclase comprise the rocks. The Irruputuncu I lava flows are composed of trachyandesitic with biotite and plagioclase, while the Queñoas are composed of  andesite and trachyandesite. The block and ash flows and Crater lavas consist of solely trachyandesitic rocks. Overall, these rocks belong to the potassium-rich calc-alkaline series typical of CVZ volcanoes. The magmas are formed by plagioclase and clinopyroxene crystallization with some mixing. Irruputuncu's rocks show minor evidence of crustal contamination, similar to other CVZ volcanoes located within transition zones.

Water is the most important component in the volcano's fumarolic gases, comprising 96.05% to 97.95% by volume. Examinations of  deuterium and oxygen-18 content of the water have determined that like the water of fumaroles in other Andean volcanic centres, Irruputuncu water is a mixture of weather-related water and water contained in andesite. The helium isotope ratios indicate the magmatic component dominates the gasses at Irruputuncu, Much of the carbon dioxide comes from subducted and crustal carbonates. Argon isotope ratios appear to be radiogenic.

Eruptive history 
The oldest rocks at Irruputuncu are lavas that have been dated by potassium-argon dating to 10.8 ± 0.6 mya. The oldest component clearly belonging to the volcano is the El Pozo ignimbrite that was erupted 258.2 ± 48.8 ka, forming a multi-layered ignimbrite that was probably generated by the injection of new, hot magma into older, cooler magma. A lava dome on the upper flank on the western side of the volcano is 0.14 ± 0.04 mya old. The block and ash flow between 55.9 ka and 140 ka old, but has not been precisely dated. The Crater lavas are 55.9 ± 26.8 ka old. The block and ash flow on the southwestern flank was formed 1570 ± 900 years BP. Tephra layers found in the Salar Grande area of the Atacama Desert may originate at Irruputuncu.

Historical activity of Irruputuncu is unclear. An unconfirmed eruption was reported in Bolivia in December 1989 and fumarolic activity in the crater was reported on 25 March 1990. Another report indicates activity in December 1960. The plume's colour changed between black and white repeatedly. Another plume was observed on 1 September 2003; neither of these incidents were accompanied  with noticeable ground deformation. Like some other volcanoes in the area, activity at Irruputuncu has not been preceded by ground inflation during historical times. Several theories, including aliasing of the imagery, have been proposed to explain the lack of ground inflation. 

Ongoing seismic activity at a rate of about 56 earthquakes per 10 days recorded in two separate phases, November 2005-March 2006 and April 2010-February 2011 respectively and including one seismic swarm during the first measurement period, has been recorded at Irruputuncu. Some of this activity may be caused by mine blasts from nearby mining projects. Geothermal anomalies of about  have been noted, including hot springs west and northwest of the volcano.

Threats and geothermal prospecting 
With the exception of Peruvian volcanoes such as Misti, most of the volcanoes of the CVZ are in remote areas and are not closely watched. Irruputuncu is a remote volcano; a road between Iquique and the Collahuasi mine and mining infrastructure west of the volcano are the major sites that could be affected by future activity. 

The 1995 eruption drew attention to volcanic hazards in the Western Cordillera. In Chile, Irruputuncu is surveilled by SERNAGEOMIN, which produces regular status reports and which in 2020 classified it as a "type III" volcano, owing to its proximity to Collahuasi mine. There are also hazard maps available. Future eruptions could involve both the emission of lava domes and lava flows or explosive eruptions; the western and northwestern flanks would be the most affected.

Irruputuncu has been examined as a potential location for a geothermal energy project involving a company named .

Climate and vegetation 

Polylepis tarapacana trees on Irruputuncu have been used (through tree rings) to reconstruct atmospheric radiocarbon concentrations and regional climatic variability, including El Niño-Southern Oscillation variability.

See also 

 Geology of Bolivia
 Geology of Chile
 List of volcanoes in Bolivia
 List of volcanoes in Chile

References

External links 
 AVA Images

Volcanoes of Potosí Department
Volcanoes of Tarapacá Region
Stratovolcanoes of Chile
Andean Volcanic Belt
Active volcanoes
Subduction volcanoes
Bolivia–Chile border
International mountains of South America
Mountains of Bolivia
Mountains of Chile
Polygenetic volcanoes
Holocene stratovolcanoes
Quaternary South America